The Journey: Our Homeland (Chinese: 信约：我们的家园, also known as Our Homeland) is the third and final season of Mediacorp Channel 8's nation-building trilogy The Journey, the previous two being The Journey: A Voyage and The Journey: Tumultuous Times. Production began in January 2015 and debut in 16 July 2015 with a total of 30 episodes. The show aired at 9pm on weekdays and had a repeat telecast at 8am the following day. It stars the young casts with Rui En, Shaun Chen, Felicia Chin, Rebecca Lim, Romeo Tan and Zhang Zhenhuan as the main cast of the third instalment. The show is Channel 8 mid year blockbuster for 2015.

Like its predecessors The Journey: A Voyage and The Journey: Tumultuous Times, Our Homeland will be the third periodical drama to use CGI.

The series will be Channel 8's 2015 mid-year blockbuster celebrating Singapore's 50th National Day (SG50). The series is partly sponsored by the Media Development Authority (MDA) of Singapore.

Cast

Main cast

 Rui En as Yang Meixue 杨美雪
 Shaun Chen as Zhang Jia 张佳
 Felicia Chin as Zhang Min 张敏
 Rebecca Lim as Wan Feifei  万菲菲:  A factory seamstress who, in order to pay her mother's medical bill, becomes a bar hostess. She is also one of the victims who were trapped during the Collapse of Hotel New World.
 Venus Lim as young Wan Feifei
 Romeo Tan as Hong Kuan 洪宽
 Ian Teng as younger Hong Kuan
 Zhang Zhenhuan as Yan Yisheng 严义生
 Andie Chen as Hong Dangyong 洪当勇
 Jeffrey Xu as Hong Rui 洪锐
 Alston Yeo as younger Hong Rui
 Aloysius Pang as Hong Guo'an 洪国安
 Nick Teo as Hong Guoshun 洪国顺
 Jeanette Aw as Hong Minghui 洪明慧
 Renfred Ng 黄业伦 as Zhang Junteng 张骏腾
 Aileen Tan as Yang Lihua 杨丽华
 Chen Guohua as Wan Shan 万山
 Chen Huihui 陈慧慧 as Bai Jin Nu 白金女
 Shane Pow as Wan Zihua 万子华
 Andres Neo Bo Jun as younger Wan Zihua
 Ian Fang as Wan Zicong 万子聪
 Cheryl Wee as 黄馨慧 as Wan Fangfang 万芳芳
 Jayley Woo as Wan Yiting 万怡婷
 Li Wenhai as Yan Songtao 严松涛
 Lin Meijiao as Su Qiufeng 苏秋凤
 James Seah 谢宏辉 as Yan Yimin 严义民
 Darren Lim as Dai Xiaoxiong 戴晓雄
 Li Yuejie 李岳杰 as Ah Niu/Spareribs 阿牛
 Laura Kee 纪丽晶 as Ah Niu's wife 阿牛嫂
 Marcus Mok 莫健发 as Yao Renyi 姚仁艺
 Tracer Wong 王裕香 as Liwan 丽婉
 Julie Tan as Yao Jiahui 姚嘉慧

Others 

 Zhang Wen Xiang 张汶祥 as Jingui 金贵
 Jae Liew 柳胜美 as Liu Daidi 刘带娣
 Joey Feng 冯瑾瑜 as Liu Qing 柳青
 Rashidal Binti Enee as Fatimah 花蒂玛
 Darius Tan 陈日成 as Ah Xiao 阿笑
 Vincent Tee 池素宝 as Bao Dating 包打听
 Darryl Yong as Peishuang 
 林伟德 as Zhiqiang 志强
 Dennis George Heath as Mr. Robertson
 Karen Jean Stott as Mrs. Robertson
 黄毅新 as Blockhead 阿呆
 Romeo Tan as Zhang Yan 张晏
 Kelly Lim LT 林俐廷 as Mei-jie 妹姐
 Drake Lim 林文强 as Secretary Liang 梁秘书
 Ye Shipin 叶世品 as Richard
 柯迪宏 as Ah Shun 阿顺
 周全喜 as Uncle Hai 海叔
 Ho Ai Ling 何爱玲 as Xiuxiu 秀秀
 谭丽芳 as Yuejiao 月娇
 杨迪嘉 as Li Yuluan 李玉鸾
 Leron Heng 王丽蓉 as Meiyun 美云
 Cansen Goh 吴开深 as Chen Ze 陈泽
 Shirley Teo 张思丽 as Mimi 咪咪
 李世雄 as Tanaka 田中
 Henry Heng 王利秦 as Bernard
 郑开怀 as Ah Ming 阿明
 Kanny Theng as Xiaohong 小红
 Kelvin Soon 孙文海 as Albert
 王瑞显 as Sam
 Jim Koh 许晋鸣 as Ah Quan 阿泉
 郑逸钦 as Uncle Huang 黄柏
 邱雁玲 as Sharon
 颜孝玄 as Mr. Thomas

Trivia
The store that the Hong family opened was a reference to The Little Nyonya.

Release 
Malaysia's satellite channel Astro Shuang Xing was to air the show first in Asia, beginning from 9 July 2015, Sundays to Thursdays, as with Mind Game (aired on 30 April) and Super Senior (11 June). However, on the discretion of MediaCorp, Shuang Xing has to air the show on the same day as Singapore from 23 July 2015, Mondays to Fridays. Hence, the show was pre-empted five times there. This caused Taiwan SET's Be With You 2 episodes back-to-back telecast to be pushed forward to 5.00pm from 16 to 23 July. In fact, Astro shouldn't have aired MediaCorp dramas first before Singapore does so beginning with Mind Game, as it did not perform well in Singapore and is also nominated for only one technical award in Star Awards 2016, and that only Super Senior and The Dream Makers II were the only dramas in the planned First Global Premiere to win performance categories.  The changes in schedule partially influenced Shuang Xing's timeslots of series airing later — following the end of Hong Kong's HKTV global premiere, with effect from 24 September, the channel resumed airing dramas on Mondays to Fridays, and back-to-back encores on Saturdays and Sundays, with the first series to use the new timeslots being Chinese series Best Get Going and MediaCorp's Hand In Hand. Other dramas, such as Youth Power, K Song Lover and My Husband is a Cartoonist, changed their schedules as well, with the exception of same-day telecast as Taiwan series Love Cuisine.

The Series repeat its telecast on Channel 8 from 4:30pm to 6:30pm on weekends succeeding The Journey: Tumultuous Times.

Other media 
This series was adapted as a comic and has been selling at Popular Bookstores since November 2015, targeting at upper primary and secondary students. The comic showcases the best of the series, and is promoted by the Committee to Promote Chinese Language.

Soundtrack

Accolades
Our Homeland has the next-to-most number of nominations for Star Awards 2016, with 16 nominations - 7 technical, 7 performance and 2 voting-based - in 14 award categories, down from 17 in 2015. The series has at least one nomination in every technical award for drama programmes, winning the Best Cameraman (for Drama Programmes) award. It won one award out of 14 awards.

Jeanette Aw won six voting-based awards in Star Awards 2015 Show 1, including three Most Popular Regional Artiste Awards, Social Media Award and Favourite Female Character award for her role in The Journey: Tumultuous Times. Aw expressed her wish to withdraw from voting-based award categories in the future. Speaking to the media after the ceremony, Aw said that the move is due to her concern about rabid fans who left messages online saying that they would harm themselves if she did not win enough awards. However, it can be seen that voting for Star Awards 2016 Favourite Female Character for both this series and The Dream Makers II did not remove her from the voting list. Mediacorp quotes that as these awards are determined by online voting, she still had to participate in these awards. She went on to win the Favourite Female Character and Favourite Onscreen Couple (Drama) with Qi Yuwu for The Dream Makers II in 2016, which was the last time the Favourite categories were held.

References 

Singapore Chinese dramas
2015 Singaporean television series debuts
2015 Singaporean television series endings
Channel 8 (Singapore) original programming